Saratoga is an unincorporated community in Clarke County, Virginia. Saratoga lies to the south of Boyce. Saratoga gets its name from the home Daniel Morgan built here in 1782. The home itself is named for the American Revolutionary War battles of Saratoga, New York, in which Morgan played an important role.

Unincorporated communities in Clarke County, Virginia
Unincorporated communities in Virginia
1782 establishments in Virginia